Chinese virus or China virus may refer to:
 Chinese virus, a term for SARS-CoV-2 and COVID-19 that is generally associated with xenophobia related to the pandemic
Plant viruses affecting species in the potato/tomato family:
 Clerodendrum golden mosaic China virus
 Tomato leaf curl China virus
 Tomato yellow leaf curl China virus

See also
 Chinese coronavirus (disambiguation)
 Lists of virus taxa, including several species of virus having specific names with Chinese demonyms and geonyms